Marquis  was a bureaucrat, government minister and court official in late Meiji period Japan.

Biography

Sasaki was born into a samurai class family in Agawa District, Tosa Domain (in the present-day city of Kōchi, Kōchi Prefecture). He served the Yamauchi clan in several important posts, including kōri-bugyō (country magistrate) and ōmetsuke (inspector). He also supported Sakamoto Ryōma in the Taisei hōkan movement to restore political power to the Emperor of Japan at the expense of the Tokugawa Shogunate. During the Boshin War, he commanded the Kaientai, a paramilitary group of Tosa samurai youths, and occupied the Tokugawa magistrate's office at Nagasaki.

After the Meiji Restoration, Sasaki served the Meiji government as sangi (councilor) and taifu (senior vice minister) of the Ministry of Justice. In 1871, Sasaki was selected to be a member of the Iwakura Mission, and traveled around the globe. On his return, he found that many of his countrymen had quit the government over the Seikanron debate; however, Sasaki chose to remain in the Genrōin as an active member of the new government.

During the Satsuma Rebellion, Sasaki was sent to his native Kōchi to ensure that the rebellion would not spread to the disaffected former samurai in Shikoku. For these efforts, he gained the deep confidence of Emperor Meiji and was appointed as privy councilor as well as one of Emperor Meiji’s chamberlains and close confidant. In 1884, he was elevated to the title of count (hakushaku) in the kazoku peerage system.

Sasaki was later selected to be one of the tutors involved in the education of Crown Prince Haru (the future Emperor Taishō), as well as Emperor Meiji’s daughters, Princesses Masako and Fusako.

In his later years, Sasaki was known for his conservative political views. He was instrumental in the creation of the Jingi-in, the government body heading the State Shinto religion. He was also associated with Nishimura Shigeki in promoting patriotic education and emperor worship in the public school curriculum. He was one of the founders of the Kōgaku-in (later Kokugakuin University). In 1909, he title was elevated to that of marquis (kōshaku). He died in 1910, and his grave is at the Aoyama Cemetery in Tokyo.

Notes

References
 Gluck, Carol. (1985). Japan’s Modern Myths: Ideology in the late Meiji Period. Princeton: Princeton University Press. ; ;  OCLC 11676767
 Jansen, Marius B. (2000). The Making of Modern Japan. Cambridge: Harvard University Press. ;  OCLC 44090600
 ___.  (1961). Sakamoto Ryoma and the Meiji Restoration. Princeton: Princeton University Press. OCLC 413111
 Keene, Donald. (2002). Emperor of Japan: Meiji and His World, 1852-1912. New York: Columbia University Press. ; OCLC 46731178
 Sims, Richard. (2001). Japanese Political History Since the Meiji Renovation 1868-2000. New York: Palgrave Macmillan. ; ;  OCLC 45172740

External links
National Diet Library Bio & Photo

1830 births
1910 deaths
People from Kōchi, Kōchi
People of Meiji-period Japan
People of the Boshin War
Samurai
Kazoku
Japanese Shintoists
Members of the Iwakura Mission
Burials in Japan